The Bhagavata tradition, also called Bhagavatism, refers to an ancient religious sect that traced its origin to the region of Mathura. After its syncretism with the Brahmanical tradition of Vishnu, Bhagavatism became a pan-Indian tradition by the second century BCE, according to R.C. Majumdar.

Historically, Bhagavatism corresponds to the development of a popular theistic movement in India, departing from the elitist sacrificial rites of Vedism, and initially focusing on the worship of the Vrishni hero Vāsudeva in the region of Mathura. It later assimilated into the concept of Narayana where Krishna is conceived as svayam bhagavan. According to some historical scholars, worship of Krishna emerged in the 1st century BCE. However, Vaishnava traditionalists place it in the 4th century BCE. Despite relative silence of the earlier Vedic sources, the features of Bhagavatism and principles of monotheism of Bhagavata school unfolding described in the Bhagavad Gita as viewed as an example of the belief that Vāsudeva-Krishna is not an avatar of the Vedic Vishnu, but is the Supreme.

Definition of Krishnaism

In the ninth century CE Bhagavatism was already at least a millennium old and many disparate groups, all following the Bhagavata Purana could be found. Various lineages of Gopala worshipers developed into identifiable denominations. However, the unity that exists among these groups in belief and practice has given rise to the general term Krishnaism. Today the faith has a significant following outside of India as well. Many places associated with Krishna such as Vrindavan attract millions of pilgrims each year who participate in religious festivals that recreate scenes from Krishna's life on Earth. Some believe that early Bhagavatism was enriched and transformed with powerful and popular Krishna tradition with a strong "human" element to it.

Initial History of Bhagavata tradition
It is believed that Bhagavatas borrowed or shared the attribute or title Purusa of their monotheistic deity from the philosophy of Sankhya. The philosophy was formulated by the end of the 4th century BCE and as time went other names such as Narayana were applied to the main deity of Krishna-Vāsudeva.

Second Early Stage
The association of the Sun-bird Garuda with the "Devadeva" ("God of Gods") Vāsudeva in the Heliodorus pillar (113 BCE) suggests that the Bhagavat cult of human deities had already absorbed the Sun-god Vishnu, an ancient Vedic deity. Slightly later, the Nagari inscription also shows the incorporation of the Brahmanical deity Narayana into the hero-cult of Bhagavatism. Vishnu would much later become prominent in this construct, so that by the middle of the 5th century CE, during the Gupta period, the term Vaishnava would replace the term Bhagavata to describe the followers of this cult, and Vishnu would now be more popular than Vāsudeva. Bhagavatism would introduce the concept of the chatur-vyuhas, in which the four earthly emanations of Narayana were considered to be Vasudeva (Krishna) as the creator, Sankarsana (Balarama) as the preserver, Pradyumna as the destroyer, and Aniruddha as the aspect of intellect. The concept of vyuhas would later be supplanted by the concept of avataras, indicating the transformation of Bhagavatism into Vaishnavism.

Some relate absorption by Brahmanism to be the characteristic of the second stage of the development of the Bhagavata tradition. It is believed that at this stage Krishna-Vāsudeva was identified with the deity of Vishnu, that according to some belonged to the pantheon of Brahmanism.

Rulers onwards from Chandragupta II, Vikramaditya were known as parama Bhagavatas, or Bhagavata Vaishnavas. The Bhagavata Purana entails the fully developed tenets and philosophy of the Bhagavata cult where Krishna gets fused with Vasudeva and transcends Vedic Vishnu and cosmic Hari to be turned into the ultimate object of bhakti.

Adoption in Tamilakam 
With the fall of the Guptas, Bhagavatism had lost its pre-eminence in the north, with Vardhana sovereigns such as Harsha adhering to non-Bhagavata creeds. Though the Bhagavata religion still flourished in the north, its stronghold was now not the valley of the Ganges or Central India, but the Tamil country. There, the faith flourished under the strong impetus given by the Alvars, “who by their Tamil songs inculcated Bhakti and Krishna-worship mainly.” Bhagavatism had penetrated into the Deccan at least as early as the first century BCE. The Silappadikaram and the other ancient Tamil poems refer to temples dedicated to Krishna and his brother at Madura, Kaviripaddinam, and other cities. The wide prevalence of Bhagavatism in the far south is also testified to by the Bhagavata Purana which says that in the Kali Age, devoted worshippers of Narayana, though rare in some places, are to be found in large numbers in the Dravida country watered by the rivers Tamraparnl, Kritamala, the sacred Kaveri, and the great stream (Periyar) flowing to the west. Yamunacharya, who laid the tenets of the Vishishtadvaita philosophy, has his works described as "a somwhat modified and methodical form of the ancient Bhagavata, Pancharatra, or Satvata religion". The Alvars would be among the first catalysts of the Bhakti movement, a Hindu revivalist movement that would reintroduce Bhagavata philosophy back to its place of origin.

Literary references
References to Vāsudeva also occur in early Sanskrit literature. Taittiriya Aranyaka (X, i,6) identifies him with Narayana and Vishnu. Pāṇini, ca. 4th century BCE, in his Ashtadhyayi explains the word "Vāsudevaka" as a Bhakta (devotee) of Vāsudeva. At some stage during the Vedic period, Vāsudeva and Krishna became one deity or three distinct deities Vāsudeva-Krishna, Krishna-Gopala and Narayana, all become identified with Vishnu., and by the time of composition of the redaction of Mahabharata that survives till today.

A Gupta period research makes a "clear mention of Vāsudeva as the exclusive object of worship of a group of people", who are referred to as Bhagavatas.

According to an opinion of some scholars, in Patanjali's time identification of Krishna with Vāsudeva is an established fact as is surmised from a passage of the Mahabhasya – (jaghana kamsam kila vasudevah). This "supposed earliest phase is thought to have been established from the sixth to the fifth centuries BCE at the time of Pāṇini, who in his Astadhyayi explained the word vāsudevaka as a bhakta, devotee, of Vāsudeva and it is believed that Bhagavata religion with the worship od Vāsudeva Krishna was at the root of the Vaishnavism in Indian history."

Other meanings
In the recent times, this often refer to a particular sect of Vaishnavas in West India, referring to themselves as 'Bhagavata-sampradaya'.

It is also a common greeting among the followers of Ramanujacharya and other yoga sects.

It can also refer to a Buddhist concept.

See also
 Bhagavata Purana
Devi-Bhagavata Purana
 Krishna
 Vaishnavism
 Svayam bhagavan
 Bhagavad Gita
 Heliodorus pillar
 Nava rasas
 Bhagavan

References

Further reading
 

 
 
 

 
 

 
 Garuda Pillar of Besnagar, Archaeological Survey of India, Annual Report (1908–1909). Calcutta: Superintendent of Government Printing, 1912, 129.
 
 
 
 
 
 

Vaishnavism
Krishnaite Vaishnava denominations
Bhakti movement
Monotheistic religions